Gorirossia is a genus of mites in the family Veigaiidae.

Species
 Gorirossia whartoni Farrier, 1957

References

Mesostigmata